Highland East Cushitic, or Sidamic, is a branch of the Afroasiatic language family spoken in south-central Ethiopia. They are often grouped with Lowland East Cushitic, Dullay, and Yaaku as East Cushitic, but that group is not well defined and is considered dubious.

The languages are: 
Burji (divergent)
Sidamic proper
Sidama
Gedeo
Hadiyya–Libido
Kambaata–Alaba.

Except for Burji, they are closely related. Hadiyya and Libido are especially close, as are Kambaata and Alaba. The most populous language is Sidama, with close to two million speakers.

Notes

References 
Hudson, Grover. 1981. The Highland East Cushitic family vine. Sprache und Geschichte in Afrika 3.97-124.
Hudson, Grover. 1988. The Highland Cushitic hypothesis.  Proceedings of the Eighth International Conference of Ethiopian Studies (Addis Ababa, 1984), Taddese Beyene, ed., 693-696. Birmingham, England: Elm Press.
Hudson, Grover. 1989. Highland East Cushitic Dictionary (Kuschitische Sprachstudien 7). Hamburg: Buske.
Hudson, Grover. 2005. Highland East Cushitic languages, Encyclopedia of Language and Linguistics, 2nd ed., Keith Brown, ed., 294-298. Elsevier: Oxford.
Hudson, Grover. 2007a. Highland East Cushitic morphology, Morphologies of Asian and African Languages, vol. 1, Alan S. Kaye, ed., 529-545. Winona Lake, IN: Eisenbrauns.
Sasse, Hans-Jürgen. 1979. The consonant phonemes of Proto-East-Cushitic (PEC): A first approximation. Malibu: Undena Publications.
Wedekind, Klaus. 1980. Sidamo, Gedeo (Derasa), Burji: Phonological differences and likenesses.  Journal of Ethiopian Studies 14: 131-76.
Wedekind, Klaus. 1990. Generating narratives: interrelations of knowledge, text variants, and Cushitic focus strategies.  Trends in Linguistics. Studies and Monographs, 52. Berlin: Mouton de Gruyter.

East Cushitic languages
Languages of Ethiopia